Nikolay Polukhin (born July 7, 1982) is a Russian cross-country skier, biathlete and Paralympic Champion. He is notable for winning the most medals at the Vancouver 2010 Winter Paralympics, with six medals, including one gold.

Polukhin was blinded in 1993 in an electrical accident. His sighted guide at Vancouver 2010 was Andrey Tokarev.

References

External links
Athlete Search Results – Polukhin, Nikolay, International Paralympic Committee (IPC)
Nikolay Polukhin – Profile at the Official site of Vancouver 2010

Russian male cross-country skiers
Russian male biathletes
Paralympic biathletes of Russia
Paralympic cross-country skiers of Russia
Biathletes at the 2010 Winter Paralympics
Cross-country skiers at the 2010 Winter Paralympics
Paralympic gold medalists for Russia
Paralympic silver medalists for Russia
Paralympic bronze medalists for Russia
1982 births
Living people
Biathletes at the 2014 Winter Paralympics
Medalists at the 2010 Winter Paralympics
Medalists at the 2014 Winter Paralympics
Paralympic medalists in cross-country skiing
Paralympic medalists in biathlon
21st-century Russian people
20th-century Russian people